is a legendary figure of early ninth-century Japan associated with Kūkai and the Shikoku 88 temple pilgrimage.

Legend

A mendicant visited the house of Emon Saburō, richest man in Shikoku, seeking alms. Emon refused, broke the pilgrim's begging bowl, and chased him away. After his eight sons fell ill and died, Emon realized that Kūkai was the affronted pilgrim and set out to seek his forgiveness. Having travelled round the island twenty times clockwise in vain, he undertook the route in reverse. Finally he collapsed exhausted and on his deathbed Kūkai appeared to grant absolution. Emon requested that he be reborn into a wealthy family in Matsuyama so that he might restore a neglected temple. Dying, he clasped a stone. Shortly afterwards a baby was born with his hand grasped tightly around a stone inscribed "Emon Saburō is reborn."

Monuments
Emon Saburo's grave is beside the path between Temple 11 and Temple 12, at the spot where he fell. Near Temple 46 there is a burial mound said to contain his eight sons. At Ishite-ji there is a casket containing the eponymous stone.

Interpretation
The legend supports a number of practices of the Shikoku pilgrimage: it encourages the custom of osettai or alms; suggests wealth should be spent endowing temples; gives an origin for the practice of reverse circuits of the island; and promises absolution for pilgrims.

See also
Kūkai
Shikoku 88 temple pilgrimage
Ishite-ji
Aetiology

References

People of Heian-period Japan
Heian period Buddhists
Buddhist pilgrimage sites in Japan